Zion-Benton Township High School District 126 is a high school district in northeastern Lake County, Illinois.  It has two high schools, both in Zion: Zion-Benton Township High School at 3901 West 21st Street, and New Tech High at Zion-Benton East at 1634 23rd Street. , the district's superintendent is Dr. Jesse Rodriguez.

References

School districts in Lake County, Illinois
Zion, Illinois